In geography, knoll is another term for a knowe or hillock, a small, low, round natural hill or mound.

Knoll may also refer to:

Places
 Knoll Camp, site of an Iron Age hill fort Hampshire, England, United Kingdom
 Knoll Lake, Leonard Canyon, Arizona, United States
 The Knoll, a knoll on Ross Island, near Antarctica
 The Knoll, an estate in Hove, England, United Kingdom, (see Hangleton)

People with the name
 Knoll (surname)

Brands and enterprises
 Knoll (company), an industrial design and office furniture manufacturing company
 Knoll Pharmaceuticals, a German drug development company taken over by Abbott Laboratories in 2002

Other uses
 Knoll (oceanography), a underwater geological feature
 Knolls Atomic Power Laboratory, a US government research and development facility

See also
 Grassy Knoll (disambiguation)
 Green Knowe
 Greenknowe Tower
 Gnoll (disambiguation)
 Knol (disambiguation)
 Knole House, a stately home in Kent, England
 Knowle (disambiguation)
 Knowles (disambiguation)